Stefan R. Underhill (born June 9, 1956) is a Senior United States district judge of the United States District Court for the District of Connecticut.

Education and career

Born in Battle Creek, Michigan in 1956, after earning a Bachelor of Arts degree in 1978 from the University of Virginia and a Bachelor of Arts degree from Oxford University (Merton College, Oxford) in 1981, he received a Juris Doctor from Yale Law School, after which he clerked for Judge Jon O. Newman of the United States Court of Appeals for the Second Circuit. He was in private practice in Stamford, Connecticut in 1984 and from 1985 to 1999.

Federal judicial service

Underhill was nominated by President Bill Clinton to fill a seat on the United States District Court for the District of Connecticut vacated by Peter Collins Dorsey on January 26, 1999 and was confirmed by the United States Senate on June 30, 1999. He received his commission on July 7, 1999. He became chief judge in September 2018. He assumed senior status on November 1, 2022.

Notable case

Underhill ruled in 2010 that cheerleading could not be used by Quinnipiac University to replace women's volleyball as a female sport to satisfy Title IX requirements (Biediger, et al., v. Quinnipiac University).

Adjunct professor

Underhill teaches a course on federal courts as an adjunct professor at the University of Connecticut School of Law, and a course on federal sentencing at the University of Virginia School of Law. In the spring, he frequently teaches a complex litigation practicum at Yale Law School.

References

Sources
 

1956 births
Living people
20th-century American judges
21st-century American judges
Alumni of Merton College, Oxford
Judges of the United States District Court for the District of Connecticut
People from Battle Creek, Michigan
United States district court judges appointed by Bill Clinton
University of Virginia alumni
Yale Law School alumni